Limbobotys acanthi is a moth in the family Crambidae. It was described by Zhang and Li in 2013. It is found in China (Hainan).

References

Moths described in 2013
Pyraustinae